To calculate the seeding for the 2006 FIFA World Cup, FIFA used the FIFA World Rankings in combination with performances of national teams in the two previous World Cups.

Points were allocated on the basis of 32 for the best achieving of the 32 qualifiers for 2006 FIFA World Cup in each of the five fields considered, down to one for the lowest ranking.

The seedings table uses these points obtained from the 1998 FIFA World Cup and the 2002 FIFA World Cup averaged in a 1:2 ratio respectively, added to the average number of points derived from the World Rankings at three given dates (at ratio 1:1:1), December 2003, December 2004, and November 2005. This generates a view of how well the teams have performed over the last ten years (since the rankings in 2003 include results from eight years previous to that) with a specific focus on how the teams have performed in the FIFA World Cup on previous occasions. Significant differences between this ranking of the teams and the official FIFA rankings at the time of the draw can be seen for Czech Republic, Germany and South Korea (ρ=0.87).

System change
Unlike the 2002 FIFA World Cup seeding system which used performances of national teams in the three previous World Cups, this seeding system only used the last two. Had Denmark not failed to qualify they would have been seeded at the expense of Argentina.

Progress of seeded teams
All 8 seeded teams qualified for the knockout stages of the tournament, but France and Mexico failed to win their groups, and so had to play other seeded teams in the second round.  Mexico lost to Argentina, and France beat Spain, so while Spain and Mexico were eliminated earlier than the seedings would have predicted, Ukraine and Portugal went farther than the seedings predicted, Portugal going on to reach the semi-finals.

Criticisms
The formula was disregarded in deciding which European team should go in the special pot for the draw (necessary to avoid three UEFA teams in one group). Serbia and Montenegro were picked purely because they were the lowest in the FIFA World Rankings at the time of the draw, despite the World Cup seeding formula placing Ukraine and Switzerland lower.
Some controversy arose when the Netherlands were left unseeded, leading some to believe that the ranking system overly penalises teams that miss out on qualification for previous World Cups.
Each monthly FIFA World Ranking at that time included eight years' worth of matches, so by combining the three rankings (December 2003, December 2004, and November 2005), the seeding was most heavily impacted by matches occurring in 2003.

References

Seeding
FIFA World Cup seeding